The Temp Life is an American comedy web series about a spoiled executive temping his way back up the corporate ladder. The series was created and produced by Wilson Cleveland (who stars as Nick "Trouble" Chiapetta); written by Wilson Cleveland (seasons 1–3), Yuri Baranovsky (season 4), Tony Janning and Gabe Uhr (season 5) and directed by Evan Ferrante (seasons 1–3), Jato Smith and Andrew Y. Park (seasons 4–5).

Overall, 43 episodes of The Temp Life were released over the course of five seasons. The first season consisted of five 3-5 minute long episodes and debuted November 29, 2006 on YouTube, Blip, MySpace, Daily Motion and Facebook.  In January 2010, The Temp Life became available on demand in two million U.S. hotel rooms via LodgeNet’s DoNotDisturbTV hotel room network.

The Temp Life added an average of 85% more viewers with each season and had reached over 18 million upload views  when it was announced in July 2010 that the series was renewed for a fifth season.

The fifth and final season premiered December 6, 2010 on My Damn Channel, YouTube, iTunes, MSN Video and VOD platforms like Roku and Boxee set-top boxes and Verizon Fios.

Series overview

Episodes

Season 1 (2006-2008)

Season 2 (2008)

Season 3 (2009)

Season 4 (2009-2010)

Season 5 (2010-2011)

References 

Temp Life